The Puig de Comanegra is a mountain of Catalonia, on the border between Spain and France. Located in the Pyrenees, it has an elevation of 1557.4 metres above sea level. It is the southernmost point of mainland France.

See also
Mountains of Catalonia

References

Mountains of Catalonia
Mountains of the Pyrenees
Emblematic summits of Catalonia
Extreme points of France